A partial solar eclipse occurred on February 14, 1953. A solar eclipse occurs when the Moon passes between Earth and the Sun, thereby totally or partly obscuring the image of the Sun for a viewer on Earth. A partial solar eclipse occurs in the polar regions of the Earth when the center of the Moon's shadow misses the Earth.

Related eclipses

Solar eclipses of 1950–1953

References

External links 
 http://eclipse.gsfc.nasa.gov/SEplot/SEplot1951/SE1953Feb14P.GIF

1953 2 14
1953 in science
1953 2 14
February 1953 events